Tympanostomy tube, also known as a grommet or myringotomy tube, is a small tube inserted into the eardrum in order to keep the middle ear aerated for a prolonged period of time, and to prevent the accumulation of fluid in the middle ear.  The operation to insert the tube involves a myringotomy and is performed under local or general anesthesia. The tube itself is made in a variety of designs.  The most commonly used type is shaped like a grommet.  When it is necessary to keep the middle ear ventilated for a very long period, a "T"-shaped tube may be used, as these "T-tubes" can stay in place for 2–4 years.  Materials used to construct the tube are most often plastics such as silicone or Teflon.  Stainless steel tubes exist, but are no longer in frequent use.

Medical uses
 
Inserting grommets is a common surgical procedure for treating children around the world. Grommets are most commonly used to help improve hearing for children who have a condition commonly called "glue ear" (persistent otitis media with effusion) in both ears, and for preventing ear infections in children who have frequent middle ear infections. Grommets are temporary and often fall out after 12–14 months as the ear heals. 
Guidelines state that tubes are an option in:
 Recurrent acute otitis media: three ear infections in six months or four infections in a year. The evidence for this recommendation; however, is weak.
 Chronic otitis media with persistent effusion for six months (one ear) or three months (both ears).
 Persistent eustachian tube dysfunction
 Barotrauma: Especially for prevention of recurrent episodes (e.g., after air travel, hyperbaric chamber treatment).
 Grommets should not be inserted in children who have only one episode of otitis media with effusion (OME) that lasts less than three months.

Adverse effects 
Ear discharge (otorrhoea) is common in 25–75% of children after grommets are inserted. Treatments to prevent this discharge before it occurs should be limited to children who have a higher risk of otorrhoea and it is not clear which preventative treatment is better.

The risk of having persistent tympanic membrane perforation following the procedure may be low, and has been estimated at 2%. Other adverse effects are estimated at: blockage of the tympanostomy tube (7%), formation of granulation tissue (4%), grommet falls out too early (4%), and the tympanostomy tube may move towards the middle ear (0.5%). There is also a risk related to general anesthesia.

Long term effects include visible changes to the tympanic membrane. These changes usually resolve on their own and do not usually require medical treatment or result in hearing problems that are clinically significant.

Mechanism of action 
Grommets work by improving drainage in the ear and allow air to circulate in the ear. Grommet placement has been shown to improve hearing in children with glue ear and may lead to fewer middle ear infections in children who have regular episodes of acute otitis media. Grommets can be used to apply antibiotics drops in children with persistent middle ear infections.

Procedure
Although myringotomy with tube insertion can be performed under local anesthesia during a regular doctor's appointment in co-operative adults, patients requiring tube insertion are very often young children. Since damage to the ear is possible unless the patient stays quite still while being manipulated, any patient who may have difficulty lying still during the procedure typically undergoes myringotomy and tube insertion under general anesthesia.

The insertion of tympanostomy tubes is one of the most common surgical procedures performed on children. In the United States, the procedure accounts for more than 20% of all ambulatory surgery in children under 15 years.

For children with ear discharge, antibiotic ear drops may be more effective than antibiotics taken by mouth. It is not clear if antibiotic drops are better than rinsing the ear with saline.

It is usually suggested that children keep their ears dry for the first two weeks after having the procedure. It is not thought to be necessary for children to wear ear plugs when swimming or keep their ears dry after the first two weeks as the potential benefit is very small. It is approximated that a child would need to wear ear plugs for 2.8 years to prevent one additional ear infection.

Outcome
Tympanostomy tubes generally remain in the eardrum for six months to two years, with T-tubes lasting up to four years. They generally spontaneously fall out of the eardrum as the skin of the eardrum slowly migrates out towards the ear canal wall over time. The eardrum usually closes without a residual hole at the tube site but in a small number of cases a perforation can persist. There is debate among clinicians as to whether long-lasting tubes are associated with a higher incidence of adverse outcomes, such as persistent perforation, cholesteatoma, tympanosclerosis and others, as opposed to tubes designed to last for shorter durations.

References

Audiology
Diseases of middle ear and mastoid
Implants (medicine)
Ear surgery